Cyril George Hopkins (July 22, 1866 – October 6, 1919) was an American agricultural chemist who initiated the Illinois long-term selection experiment in 1896. He was also noted for his extensive research and writings on the soil of Illinois.

Hopkins was born on July 22, 1866, on a farm near Chatfield, Minnesota. He graduated from South Dakota Agricultural College in Brookings, South Dakota in 1890. He received his master's degree in 1894 and his doctoral degree in 1898, both from Cornell University. In 1894, Hopkins became the chemist at the Agriculture Experiment Station at the University of Illinois, where he continued to work until his death from malaria in 1919. At the time of his death, he was the head of the Department of Agronomy at the University of Illinois. Hopkins Hall at the University of Illinois is named in his honor.

References

1866 births
1919 deaths
19th-century American chemists
20th-century American chemists
Scientists from Minnesota
Deaths from malaria
Agricultural chemists
University of Illinois faculty
American soil scientists
South Dakota State University alumni
Cornell University alumni